Janine Krieber is a Canadian political scientist, studying terrorism and international security. Her husband is Stéphane Dion, former leader of the Liberal Party of Canada and former Minister of Foreign Affairs.
 
Krieber was born in Alma, Quebec, and is the oldest of three children.  Her mother was a journalist and her father a photographer who was born in Austria.  Krieber met Dion while the two were working toward their master's degrees in political science at Université Laval.  They later moved to France together to study at the Paris Institute of Political Studies, where they completed their respective doctoral degrees.

Upon returning to Canada, Krieber took a teaching post at Université Laval. She has since gone on to teach at Royal Military College Saint-Jean and work for the Department of National Defence in Ottawa.

In Montreal's 2013 municipal election, Krieber ran for Montreal City Council as a Projet Montréal candidate for the district of Saint-Jacques in the Ville-Marie borough. Although she won the election, she ran as a colistière for party leader Richard Bergeron; under Montreal's municipal election process, this means that Bergeron, an unsuccessful mayoral candidate in the same election, retained the right to take office as the councillor for Saint-Jacques in place of Krieber. Bergeron announced following the election that he would take the seat.

References 

Year of birth missing (living people)
Living people
Canadian political scientists
Canadian people of Austrian descent
Royal Military College Saint-Jean people
People from Alma, Quebec
Women in Quebec politics
Canadian women in municipal politics
Université Laval alumni
Spouses of Canadian politicians
Women political scientists